Vitaliy Momot (born 2 April 1990 in Ukrainian SSR) is a professional Ukrainian football defender.

After playing three seasons for the senior squad of FC Vorskla Poltava he was transferred to FC Kremin Kremenchuk in early 2011. On 30 March 2012 he joined FC Poltava.

External links 
 Profile on PFL website
 
 
 Profile on Football Squads

1990 births
Living people
Ukrainian footballers
FC Vorskla Poltava players
FC Kremin Kremenchuk players
FC Poltava players
FC Karlivka players
MFC Mykolaiv players
FC Olimpiya Savyntsi players
Ukrainian First League players
Ukrainian Second League players
Association football defenders